UFC Fight Night: Swanson vs. Ortega (also known as UFC Fight Night 123) was a mixed martial arts event produced by the Ultimate Fighting Championship that was held on December 9, 2017, at Save Mart Center in Fresno, California.

Background
While the UFC has hosted many events in Northern California, the event marked the promotion's first visit to Fresno. Former Zuffa subsidiary Strikeforce previously contested five events in Fresno, the most recent in October 2010.

A featherweight bout between Cub Swanson and Brian Ortega served as the event headliner.

Promotional newcomer John Phillips was expected to face Eryk Anders at the event. However, Phillips was removed from the card on November 2 and was replaced by fellow newcomer Markus Perez Echeimberg.

Rani Yahya was expected to face Aljamain Sterling at this event. However, Yahya was forced to pull out from the card on November 7 due to injury. He was replaced by former WSOF Bantamweight Champion Marlon Moraes.

Bryan Caraway was expected to face Luke Sanders at the event. However, on November 20, Caraway pulled out of the fight due to undisclosed reasons. He was replaced by Andre Soukhamthath.

Carls John de Tomas and Alex Perez were expected to meet in a flyweight bout at this event. However, the CSAC elected to move the bout to the bantamweight division as they were concerned with De Tomas weight during fight week.

Benito Lopez was fined 10% of his show money by the CSAC due to shoving his opponent Albert Morales at the weigh-ins ceremony. That money will go directly to the commission.

Results

Bonus awards
The following fighters were awarded $50,000 bonuses:
Fight of the Night: Brian Ortega vs. Cub Swanson
Performance of the Night: Brian Ortega and Marlon Moraes

Reported payout
The following is the reported payout to the fighters as reported to the California State Athletic Commission. It does not include sponsor money and also does not include the UFC's traditional "fight night" bonuses. The total disclosed payout for the event was $866,000.
 Brian Ortega: $58,000 (includes $29,000 win bonus) def. Cub Swanson: $76,000
 Gabriel Benítez: $28,000 (includes $14,000 win bonus) def. Jason Knight: $31,000
 Marlon Moraes: $146,000 (includes $73,000 win bonus) def. Aljamian Sterling: $36,000
 Scott Holtzman: $40,000 (includes $20,000 win bonus) def. Darrell Horcher: $15,000
 Eryk Anders: $28,000 (includes $14,000 win bonus) def. Markus Perez: $12,000
 Benito Lopez: $19,000 (includes $10,000 win bonus) def. Albert Morales: $15,000 ^
 Alexis Davis: $64,000 (includes $32,000 win bonus) def. Liz Carmouche: $30,000
 Andre Soukhamthath: $20,000 (includes $10,000 win bonus) def. Luke Sanders: $12,000 
 Alex Perez: $20,000 (includes $10,000 win bonus) def. Carls John de Tomas: $10,000
 Frankie Saenz: $40,000 (includes $20,000 win bonus) def. Merab Dvalishvili: $10,000
 Alejandro Pérez: $46,000 (includes $23,000 win bonus) def. Iuri Alcântara: $29,000
 Davi Ramos: $20,000 (includes $10,000 win bonus) def. Chris Gruetzemacher: $12,000
 Trevin Giles: $28,000 (includes $14,000 win bonus) def. Antônio Braga Neto: $10,000

^ Benito Lopez was fined 10 percent of his purse ($1,000) for shoving his opponent at the weigh-ins ceremony. That money went directly to the commission.

Aftermath
On December 29, it was announced that Carl John de Tomas failed a USADA drug test stemming from his appearance at this event following his weigh-in. On February 5, he accepted a one-year suspension.

See also
List of UFC events
2017 in UFC

References

UFC Fight Night
2017 in mixed martial arts
Mixed martial arts in California
Sports competitions in Fresno, California
December 2017 sports events in the United States
2017 in sports in California